Loyal opposition in terms of politics, refers to specific political concepts that are related to the opposition parties of a particular political system. In many Westminster-style parliamentary systems of government, the loyal opposition indicates that the non-governing parties oppose the actions of the sitting cabinet while remaining loyal to the formal source(s) of the government's power, such as the monarch or constitution. Conversely, in authoritarian and totalitarian states that operate under a façade of multi-party democracy, the loyal opposition parties – despite ostensibly claiming to oppose the actions of the ruling party – serve as its satellites in practice.

Loyal opposition in authoritarian regimes

A way for authoritarian regimes to legitimize their rule is to create the superficial appearance of a competitive democratic system. As this would naturally entail opposition parties, these parties will either have to be so excluded from the political system they cannot participate in it meaningfully (such as the Brazilian Democratic Movement during the early years of the Military dictatorship in Brazil), or to be an opposition only nominally.

An example of the latter arrangement is Uzbekistan, where all legal political parties are required to support the regime of president Shavkat Mirziyoyev and former president Islam Karimov. As there is no single formal coalition uniting them all (thus, they nominally compete against each other), the non-governing parties could be thought of as a loyal opposition.

Loyal opposition in the Westminster system sense

The phrase is derived from John Hobhouse stating His Majesty's Loyal Opposition in 1826 in a debate in the British parliament. It is intended to illustrate that Members of Parliament in a country's legislature may oppose the policies of the incumbent government—typically comprising parliamentarians from the party with the most seats in the elected legislative chamber—while maintaining deference to the higher authority of the state and the larger framework within which democracy operates. The concept thus permits the dissent necessary for a functioning democracy without fear of being accused of treason.

As Michael Ignatieff, a former leader of the loyal opposition in the House of Commons of Canada, said in a 2012 address at Stanford University:

The notion of a loyal opposition exists in various Commonwealth realms, being therein termed formally as His Majesty's Loyal Opposition and informally as the Official Opposition, with the head of the largest opposition party—normally that which holds the second largest number of seats—designated as the Leader of His (or Her) Majesty's Loyal Opposition. This tradition emerged in the oldest of the Commonwealth realms—the United Kingdom—during the 18th century.

As a consequence of this parliamentary evolution, the sovereign's right to the throne became more concrete, seeing the opposition scrutinise government legislation and policies, rather than engage in disputes between competing candidates for the Crown, each supported by different religious and economic groups. Further, the acceptance of such a thing as a loyal opposition in Parliament factored into the development of a rigid party system in the United Kingdom; the separation of Members of Parliament's loyalty to the Crown from their opposition to the sovereign's ministers eliminated the idea that there could only be one "King's Party" and that to oppose it would be disloyal or even treasonous.

The concept of a loyal parliamentary opposition came to be rooted in the other countries due to their being former British colonies, to which British parliamentary institutions were transported. Thus, the phrase His Majesty's Loyal Opposition existed in some Commonwealth realms even before the title of prime minister. Also, in federal countries, such as Canada and Australia, the phrase His Majesty's Loyal Opposition is also employed in provincial or state legislatures, in the same fashion as in other parliaments.

See also
 Opposition (politics)
 Dominant-party system
 Satellite party
 Toy parliament
 Her Majesty's loyal opposition (disambiguation)
 His Majesty's Government (term)

References

Westminster system
Opposition, loyal